Jinaratna (Jina·ratna; Hindi: जिनरत्न) was a Jain scholar monk who composed Līlāvatīsāra. He completed his poem in the year 1285 CE in Jabaliputra, western India, (modern Jalore in Rajasthan). It is an epitome of a much larger work called  composed in Jain Maharashtri, a Prakrit language, in 1036 by Jineshvara, also a Jain monk.

Jinaratna studied literature, logic and the canonical texts of the White-Clad Jains, with Jineshvara and other monks. In his colophon he acknowledges the help he received from others in the preparation and correction of the text of Līlāvatīsāra.

Jinaratna in his introductory verses to Līlāvatīsāra describes how his interest in Jineshvara's poem was stimulated by his own teacher. Jinaratna states that he began to write his epitome at the request of those who wished to concentrate on its narrative alone.

By writing in Sanskrit, the pan-Indian language of learned discourse, Jinaratna gave Līlāvatīsāra a far wider readership than was possible for Jineshvara's , since it was written in the Prakrit Jain Maharashtri, a language with a more restricted currency.

Jinaratna displays his mastery of Sanskrit poetics by interspersing complex lyric metres throughout his poem. Not only does Jinaratna employ rare works and unusual grammatical forms drawn from the Sanskrit lexicons and grammars, but he also incorporates into his poem words taken from contemporary spoken vernaculars. Jinaratna's language in the narrative portions of the poem is fast moving and direct, but it is far more ornate in his descriptions of cities, mountains, desert wilderness, battles, festivals, and other topics with which a Sanskrit epic should be embellished.

English translations
The Clay Sanskrit Library has published a translation of Līlāvatīsāra by R.C.C. Fynes under the title of The Epitome of Queen Lilávati (two volumes).

See also
Līlāvatīsāra (The Epitome of Lilavati)
Nivvāṇalīlāvaīkahā

References

External links
Clay Sanskrit Library  (official page)

Sanskrit poets
Indian Jain monks
13th-century Indian Jain poets
13th-century Jain monks
13th-century Indian monks
Poets from Rajasthan